Ronald Rothenbühler (born 15 August 1971) is a retired Swiss football defender.

References

1971 births
Living people
Swiss men's footballers
Swiss Super League players
Neuchâtel Xamax FCS players
SR Delémont players
CS Chênois players
Étoile Carouge FC players
Fraser Park FC players
FC Meyrin players
Association football defenders
Swiss expatriate footballers
Expatriate soccer players in Australia
Swiss expatriate sportspeople in Australia